Chote Suvatti (24 February 1905 – ?) was a Thai ichthyologist. He worked at the Department of Fisheries during its foundational years, and became a professor at Kasetsart University and the dean of its Faculty of Fisheries. He did pioneering work cataloguing Thailand's fish species, introducing the science of taxonomy to the field in Thailand.

References

Chote Suvatti
Chote Suvatti
Chote Suvatti
Cornell University alumni
1905 births
Year of death missing